Class 730 may refer to:

British Rail Class 730
Renfe Class 730